Michael Bruce Forsyth, Baron Forsyth of Drumlean, PC (born 16 October 1954) is a British financier and Conservative politician, who was the Member of Parliament (MP) for Stirling from 1983 to 1997 and served in the cabinet of John Major as Secretary of State for Scotland from 1995 to 1997.

He is Chairman of Secure Trust Bank, and a Director of J&J Denholm and of Denholm Logistics Ltd.  He was a director and Chairman of Hyperion Insurance Group until its merger with RKH Group in 2015.  A former Deputy Chairman of JPMorgan UK and Evercore Partners International, he was knighted in 1997 and appointed to the House of Lords in 1999. He is a member of the Privy Council and served on the Development Boards of the Royal Society and the National Portrait Gallery.  He is also a past president of the Royal Highland and Agricultural Society of Scotland.

He was appointed for a second term to the House of Lords' Economic Affairs Committee in 2015, and as its chairman following the election in 2017.  He was elected as Chairman of the Association of Conservative Peers in September 2021 (the House of Lords' equivalent to the House of Commons' 1922 Committee).  He is president of the Steamboat Association of Great Britain.

Early life
Forsyth was born in Montrose, Angus, the eldest son of John T. and Mary Forsyth. He was educated at Arbroath High School and the University of St Andrews (1972–76). He was President of the Conservative Association at St Andrews University from 1973 to 1976. At St Andrews Forsyth developed a passion for debating, history, science and campaigning.

Parliamentary career
After leaving university Forsyth was first elected to Westminster City Council from 1978 to 1983. 

He was then elected at the 1983 General Election as the MP for the Stirling constituency. His first job in government was as Parliamentary Private Secretary to the then Foreign Secretary Geoffrey Howe from 1986 to 1987. In 1987, he was appointed to the Scottish Office, first as an Under-Secretary of State (1987–90), then as Minister of State (1990–92) with responsibility over health, education, social work and sport. He was also the chair of the Scottish Conservative Party from 1989 to 1990. In 1996, he was named Parliamentarian of the Year.

He was appointed Minister of State at the Department of Employment (1992–94), then the Home Office (1994–95), he became a member of John Major's cabinet in 1995 as Secretary of State for Scotland. In 1996, as Scottish Secretary, Forsyth was credited with transferring the Stone of Scone, also known as the Stone of Destiny, from Westminster Abbey to (ultimately) Edinburgh Castle. He also established the University of the Highlands, crofters' rights to buy their land, promoted the Gaelic language and commissioned the restoration of the Great Hall at Stirling Castle.

Forsyth was re-elected in 1987 and 1992 with small majorities of less than a thousand, but lost his seat in 1997 United Kingdom general election.

Politics in Scotland
Forsyth campaigned against the Scottish Parliament having the power to vary the basic rate of income tax by up to three pence in the pound, which he dubbed the "Tartan Tax". Forsyth's persistence was widely credited with prompting the Labour Party's unexpected decision – bitterly criticised by the Liberal Democrats and the Scottish National Party – to separate out the tax-varying issue in a two-question referendum on devolution.

In 2009–10 he was a member of the Sanderson Commission that reported on Conservative Party organisation, and in 2010–11 a member of the independent Philips inquiry into the 1994 Scotland RAF Chinook crash on the Mull of Kintyre, established by the Secretary of State for Defence.

In 2011, Forsyth criticised the plans of Conservative MSP Murdo Fraser to disband the Scottish Conservatives and establish a wholly new centre-right party, should he win the forthcoming leadership election. Forsyth later declared his backing for a rival candidate, Ruth Davidson.

House of Lords
Forsyth was nominated to the Privy Council in 1995, was knighted in 1997 and was raised to the peerage as Baron Forsyth of Drumlean, of Drumlean in Stirling (Drumlean is a small area near Aberfoyle in the district of Stirling) on 14 July 1999. 

Following his elevation to the Lords, he has held a number of positions. He was a member of the Commission on Strengthening Parliament (1999–2000), the Select Committee on the Monetary Policy Committee of the Bank of England, the Joint Committee of both Houses of Parliament on Reform of the House of Lords, and the Select Committee on the Barnett Formula. 

From October 2005 to October 2006, he was Chairman of the Conservative Party's Tax Reform Commission, established by then Shadow Chancellor of the Exchequer, George Osborne MP. He served as a member of the House of Lords select committee on Economic Affairs from 2007 to 2011. He has also been a member of the joint committee on National Security Strategy and a member of the special select committee on soft power. He was appointed for a second term to the House of Lords' Economic Affairs Committee in 2015, and as its chairman following the election in 2017.  In 2021, he was elected as Chairman of the Association of Conservative Peers.

Business career

After leaving the House of Commons Forsyth has undertaken posts in the City of London. He joined Flemings as a director of Corporate Finance and, following the bank's sale to JPMorgan Chase he became vice-chairman Investment Banking Europe at JPMorgan (1999–2001) and then Deputy Chairman of JPMorgan (2002–05). 

He joined Evercore Partners International LLP, an investment bank, in 2005 – leaving his post as deputy chairman in March 2012. He was a director of NBNK Investments PLC, and a director and Chairman of Hyperion Insurance Group until its merger with RKH Group in 2015. He is currently Chairman of Secure Trust Bank, and a Director of J&J Denholm Ltd and of Denholm Logistics Ltd.

Philanthropy and personal life
Forsyth married Susan Clough in Cumbria in 1977 and they have three grown-up children. He is the founder of the Pimlico Tree and Preservation Trust, now the Westminster Tree Trust. In 2010 he climbed the highest mountain in Antarctica, Mount Vinson, in support of CINI and Marie Curie Cancer Care, having previously climbed Mount Aconcagua and Mount Kilimanjaro, the highest mountains in the Americas and Africa respectively. 

His charitable fund-raising achievements are substantial and include £220,000 for DebRA for climbing Mount Kilimanjaro, £420,000 for CINI and Marie Curie Cancer Care for climbing Mount Vinson, and £500,000 to support the families of victims of 9/11 through organising a dinner in the City of London.

Bibliography
Reservicing Britain (London: Adam Smith Institute, 1980)
The Myths of Privatisation (London: Adam Smith Institute, 1983)

Arms

References

Bibliography
Torrance, David, The Scottish Secretaries (Birlinn 2006)

External links

Tax Reform Commission
Economic Affairs Committee reports published as Chair:
Employment and COVID-19: time for a new deal (2020)
Universal Credit isn’t working: proposals for reform (2020)
Social care funding: time to end a national scandal (2019)
Measuring inflation (2019)
Treating Students Fairly: The Economics of Post-School Education(2018)
Brexit and the Labour Market (2017)
Finance Bill Sub-Committee reports published as Chair:
Off-payroll working: treating people fairly (2020) 
The Powers of HMRC: Treating Taxpayers Fairly (2018)
Making Tax Digital for VAT: Treating Small Businesses Fairly (2018)

|-

1954 births
Alumni of the University of St Andrews
Secretaries of State for Scotland
Scottish Conservative Party MPs
Conservative Party (UK) life peers
Councillors in the City of Westminster
Living people
Members of the Privy Council of the United Kingdom
Knights Bachelor
Members of the Parliament of the United Kingdom for Scottish constituencies
People from Montrose, Angus
Scottish public relations people
UK MPs 1983–1987
UK MPs 1987–1992
UK MPs 1992–1997
Scottish bankers
Members of the Parliament of the United Kingdom for Stirling constituencies
Life peers created by Elizabeth II